Nathaniel Schnugg (born October 5, 1988), also known as "Nate", is an American tennis player. 

Schnugg has a career high ATP singles ranking of World No. 1149, achieved on November 7, 2011. He also has a career high ATP doubles ranking of World No. 990, achieved on September 18, 2006.

Schnugg attended the University of Georgia where he majored in Pre-Med. He joined the Bulldogs university team and reached as high as number 8 in the ITA Collegiate Tennis Rankings in 2008, and was named as an All-American. He was recognized and named the SEC men's tennis athlete of the week at the end of January 2009.

Married to Krista Schnugg 2019.

Junior career

As a junior, Schnugg reached as high as junior World No. 24 in the rankings (attained on September 11, 2006). Excelling in doubles, he reached three junior grand slam finals winning two titles. At 2006 Australian Open he and compatriot Kellen Damico lost the boys' doubles final to Polish pair Blazej Koniusz and Grzegorz Panfil 6–7(5–7), 3–6. At the 2006 Wimbledon Championships, again with Kellen Damico, they won the boys' doubles title defeating Slovakian duo Martin Klizan and Andrej Martin 7–6(9–7), 6–2. At the 2006 US Open, with another compatriot Jamie Hunt, he won the boys' doubles title in an all American final defeating Austin Krajicek and Jarmere Jenkins 6–3, 6–3.

Junior Grand Slam finals

Doubles: 3 (2 titles, 1 runner-up)

Professional career

Snugg made his debut on the ATP Tour at the 2006 US Open, where he and Kellen Damico were given a wild card entry into the main doubles draw. They would go on to lose to David Ferrer and Fernando Vicente 5–7, 2–6. The following year at the 2007 US Open he and Damico were again granted direct entry as a wild cards but lost in the first round 4–6, 2–6  to Jonas Bjorkman and Max Mirnyi.

Schnugg reached one career final on the ITF Futures tour, winning the doubles title at the Mexico F2 tournament in February 2006. Partnered with his older brother Scott Schnugg, the pair defeated Shane La Porte and Lazaro Navarro-Batles 7-6(7-2), 7-6(7-4) in the finals to claim his only professional title.

ATP Challenger and ITF Futures finals

Doubles: 1 (1–0)

References

External links
 
 
 

1988 births
Living people
American male tennis players
US Open (tennis) junior champions
Wimbledon junior champions
Grand Slam (tennis) champions in boys' doubles
Georgia Bulldogs tennis players
Tennis people from Oregon